Xestia caelebs is a moth of the family Noctuidae. It is known from Xinjiang. The type location is described as between Lob Noor and Kuku Noor.

References

Xestia
Moths of Asia
Moths described in 1895